Austin Lyons (born 25 May 1956), better known as Superblue, Super Blue and Blueboy, is a Trinidadian calypsonian, soca musician, and lyricist.

Early life 
Lyons was born on 25 May 1956 in Point Fortin. His mother is a Grenadian and his father is Trinidadian.

Career 
Lyons became famous from his first entry into the calypso tent world in 1980 with "Soca Baptist," a song he penned in 1979. "Soca Baptist" won him his first Carnival Road March Monarch award in 1980. He won the annual T&T Carnival Road March title ten times (in 1980, 1981 and 1983 he won under the moniker Blue Boy, and as Superblue in 1991, 1992, 1993, 1995, 2000, 2013 and 2018). He won the Trinidad & Tobago Soca Monarch (now the International Soca Monarch) title seven times, making him only the second man in the English-speaking Caribbean to win the Soca Crown seven times after Grynner of Barbados who the Road March crown in Barbados the same number of times (1983, 1984, 1985, 1988, 1989, 1990 and 1998).

Superblue is famous for wearing blue costumes and dancing on top of speaker boxes. He developed a reputation for performing daring antics while on stage for the Soca Monarch competitions.

Superblue has many children. His daughters, Terri Lyons and Fay-Ann Lyons-Alvarez are in the entertainment industry. Fay-Ann Lyons' calypsonian mother is Lady Gypsy, a soca musician (composer and performer), who won three Road March Monarch titles (2003, 2008 and 2009). Superblue recorded the song "Clear de Road" with Fay-Ann. They performed it together for the International Soca Monarch competition in 2004, placing out of the top ten. 

Since his Soca Monarch win in 2000, Superblue remained out of the winners' circle until 2011 when he received the SAO Hall of Fame Award for his body of work. He continues to record music and his earlier songs are considered classic soca compositions, used in Panorama competitions. 

He made a return to the Soca Monarch stage in 2013 with his song "Fantastic Friday," and captured the International Power Soca Monarch title in a tie with the defending champion, Machel Montano. His song was played over 500 times on Carnival Monday and Tuesday, beating Montano (who had fewer than 60 plays), by over 400 plays.

SuperBlue is hailed as the originator of the "jump and wave" style of soca songs and is credited by the benefactor of the International Soca Monarch, William Munro with a major role in the success of that competition.

His song "Barbara" was played as background music in the 1998 film Side Streets.

In 2018, Montano and Superblue jointly released "Soca Kingdom" for Carnival. They dominated the Road March competition, winning with over twice as many plays as the second place song.

Discography 

 10th Anniversary (Vinyl)
 Happy Carnival (1995)
 Flag Party (1994)
 Bacchanal Time (1993)
 Soca Matrix (2009)
 Extreme Blue (2009)
 Joy (2011)

Superblue firsts
 First calypsonian to ever perform at Wembley Convention Centre in London, UK
 First Soca Monarch winner
 "Bacchanal Time" and "Birthday Party" performances appeared on the first worldwide broadcast of Trinidad and Tobago Carnival via CNN
 First double winner of Soca Monarch and Road March in the same year with Bacchanal Time in 1993
 Only calypsonian to appear on Sesame Street

References

External links
International Soca Monarch Promo video clip for ISM21
Newsday: SuperBlue to be honoured at 'Pan-O-Brass'
Daily Express: Meet SuperBlue

1956 births
Living people
20th-century Trinidad and Tobago male singers
20th-century Trinidad and Tobago singers
Calypsonians
Soca musicians
Trinidad and Tobago people of Grenadian descent